The 1933 Colgate Red Raiders football team was an American football team that represented Colgate University as an independent during the 1933 college football season. In its fifth season under head coach Andrew Kerr, the team compiled a 6–1–1 record, shut out five of eight opponents, and outscored all opponents by a total of 189 to 12. Winston Anderson was the team captain. The team won the 200th game in program history against NYU at Yankee Stadium. The team played its home games on Whitnall Field in Hamilton, New York.

Schedule

References

Colgate
Colgate Raiders football seasons
Colgate Red Raiders football